Sam Houston High School, located in east Arlington, Texas, is a public high school serving grades 9-12.

It is one of the six high schools comprising the Arlington Independent School District in Arlington, Texas. The current principal is Juan Villarreal.

The school is also known as Sam Houston HS, SHHS, and Big Sam. The mascot is the Long Tall Texan. The school colors are red, white, and blue.

History
Sam Houston HS became Arlington School District's second high school when it opened in 1963 for the fall semester.
The first graduating class was the Class of 1965.
The school moved from its original location on Browning Drive to its current location on Sam Houston Drive in 1970. The original location became Hutcheson Junior High School.
The first IB graduating class was the Class of 2011. Since then, the school has had the most students participating in the IB program of all the high schools in the district.
More than twenty students were awarded with the IB diploma with the Class of 2013.
The original Sam Houston campus was demolished in 2015 and was rebuilt as Dan Dipert Career and Technical Center in 2017.
As of 2017, Sam Houston is the largest high school in Tarrant County with over 3,600 students. It is also one of the largest predominantly Hispanic high schools in Texas.
In 2017, Sam Houston became the first Arlington ISD high school to open the 9th Grade Center. It was open to make room for freshmen of the 2017-2018 school year.
In late fall of 2017, the school opened a second cafeteria for addition.

Feeder patterns
Anderson, Berry, Blanton, Crouch, Crow, Knox, Patrick, Roark, and Thornton Elementaries feed into Carter Jr. High. Adams, Amos, Atherton, Goodman, Hale, Johns, Morton, Rankin, and Remynse Elementaries feed into Workman Jr. High. Carter and Workman Jr. Highs feed into Sam Houston.

Academics

Sam Houston HS offers Dual Credit course opportunities at Tarrant County College, a local community college. This is in addition to the following Accelerated Academic programs:AP (Advanced Placement) ProgramAVID (Advancement Via Individual Determination) ProgramIB (International Baccalaureate) ProgramTRIO Educational Talent Search ProgramTRIO Upward Bound Program

Notable alumni

 Félix Enríquez Alcalá (class of 1969) - American film and television director.
 Mike Adams (class of 1992) - Wide Receiver Pittsburgh Steelers 
 Thasunda Brown Duckett (class of 1991) - President & CEO of TIAA
 Mark Clayton (class of 2000) - Wide Receiver Baltimore Ravens
 Damon Dunn (class of 1994) - American politician, minister, and retired football player
 Trey Hillman (class of 1981) - Major League Baseball manager
 Lisa Love (class of 1974) - Former athletic director of Arizona State University. 
 Guy Morriss (class of 1969) - Former center/guard (15 seasons) Philadelphia Eagles and New England Patriots; former head football coach at Baylor University
 Charles Randolph (class of 1981) - Film and TV writer; Won the Academy Award for the "Big Short" 2015
M. David Rudd (class of 1979) - President, University of Memphis, Internationally known psychologist, Distinguished University Professor of Psychology

The Long Tall Texan Award is presented each year at the Sam Houston High School graduation ceremony every spring to the alumni who has positively impacted the SHHS community. Award winners include:
 2018: Melynda Brooks Merrifield
 2017: Sheila Ivy Young 
 2016: Claudia Perkins 
 2015: Eric Salas 
 2014: Bobby Callas 
 2013: Billy & Cheryl Stewart 
 2012: Derrick Kinney 
 2011: Judy Thomas 
 2010: Bobby Hunt 
 2009: Justin Chapa

References

External links

Sam Houston HS website

Arlington Independent School District high schools
High schools in Arlington, Texas
Sam Houston
International Baccalaureate schools in Texas
1963 establishments in Texas
Educational institutions established in 1963